Pioneer Springs Community School is the only nature-based, tuition-free public charter school located near Huntersville, North Charlotte and the UNCC area in  the Charlotte metropolitan area, North Carolina, United States. The school is currently enrolling K-11 for Fall 2022, 12th grade will be added.Fall 2023.

Founding

The school was founded in 2012 and was approved to be converted to a tuition-free public charter school in 2014.

Pioneer Springs Community School Present 
In the 2021–2022 school year, Pioneer Springs Community School has 440 students from kindergarten -10. The average class size is 22, resulting in a 11:1 student to teacher ratio enabling a close-knit school family community. Brand NEW High School Building will be complete Fall 2022. The new Middle School Building, known as "The Hive" opened in Fall 2020.

References

External links 
 

Schools in Mecklenburg County, North Carolina
Public elementary schools in North Carolina
Public middle schools in North Carolina
Public high schools in North Carolina